Eustaquio Mira Ramos (born 2 January 1962 in Sevilla) is a wheelchair basketball athlete from Spain.  He has a physical disability: he is a 3-point wheelchair basketball player. He played wheelchair basketball at the 1996 Summer Paralympics. His team was fourth.

References

External links 
 
 
 Eustaquio Mira Ramos at the Fundación Andalucía Olímpica 

1962 births
Living people
Spanish men's wheelchair basketball players
Wheelchair category Paralympic competitors
Paralympic wheelchair basketball players of Spain
Wheelchair basketball players at the 1996 Summer Paralympics
People from Seville